The Lottery is an American post-apocalyptic drama television series that aired on Lifetime from July 20 through September 28, 2014. The series was set in a dystopian future when women have stopped having children due to an infertility pandemic. It starred Marley Shelton, Michael Graziadei, Athena Karkanis, David Alpay, Shelley Conn, Yul Vazquez and Martin Donovan.

On October 17, 2014, Lifetime cancelled The Lottery after one season.

Synopsis 
It is the year 2025, and no children have been born on Earth since 2019 due to an infertility pandemic that first became noticeable in 2016. Dr. Alison Lennon and her assistant, Dr. James Lynch, make a breakthrough in their lab work for the Department of Humanity (DOH), and are able to successfully fertilize eggs to create 100 viable human embryos. Darius Hayes, Director of the DOH, strongly believes that the embryos should immediately become property of the U.S. government. But the President of the United States, Thomas Westwood, is fighting sagging poll numbers and sides with his chief of staff, Vanessa Keller, who suggests they hold a public lottery to select 100 women who will carry the embryos to term. The DOH is also looking to control all young children in the country, which includes Elvis Walker, the six-year-old son of Kyle Walker. Meanwhile, an anti-government group called the Second of May Resistance, or "MayTwos", is also trying to seize control of the embryos for its own purposes. In researching the egg and sperm donors that produced the embryos, Alison and James discover a common bond that leads them to uncover the cause of the global infertility crisis. The battle to affect the future of the human race, along with the need to keep secrets buried, becomes a life-and-death struggle, with many paying the ultimate price.

Cast and characters

Main cast 
 Marley Shelton as Dr. Alison Lennon
 Michael Graziadei as Kyle Walker, father of Elvis
 Athena Karkanis as Chief of Staff Vanessa Keller
 David Alpay as Dr. James Lynch, Alison's colleague and lab assistant
 Shelley Conn as Gabrielle Westwood, the First Lady of the United States
 Yul Vazquez as President Thomas Westwood, the President of the United States
 Martin Donovan as Darius Hayes, the Director of the U.S. Fertility Commission and the head of the Department of Humanity (DOH)

Recurring cast 
 J. August Richards as Deputy Secretary of State Nathan Mitchell
 Jesse Filkow as Elvis Walker, Kyle's son and one of the last six children born in 2019
 Rex Linn as General Alan Langdon, the Chairman of the Joint Chiefs
 Megan Park as Rose, Darius' daughter
 Karissa Lee Staples as Perry Sommers, a Lottery finalist
 Christiana Leucas as Angela Maria Perez, a Lottery finalist
 Ernie Hudson as Randall Mitchell, a former Attorney General and Nathan's father
 Arturo del Puerto as Rojas, the leader of the MayTwos, the Second of May Resistance
 Steven Culp as Dan Melrose, the Vice President of the United States

Production
On September 16, 2013, Lifetime placed a pilot order on The Lottery. On November 4, 2013, Michael Graziadei, Lesley-Ann Brandt and Louise Lombard were cast as regulars. On November 21, 2013, Marley Shelton signed on to star in the pilot episode. David Alpay later was cast as her character's assistant. On December 2, 2013, Martin Donovan was cast as a regular and Salli Richardson was cast in a recurring role as the first lady of the United States. On February 11, 2014, Lifetime officially green-lit The Lottery with a 10-episode series order.

The series filmed in Montreal, Quebec, Canada. After the pilot was picked up by Lifetime, several characters were recast. Lesley-Ann Brandt was reduced to recurring status, Athena Karkanis replaced Louise Lombard as Chief of Staff Vanessa Keller. Yul Vazquez was cast as President of the United States, and Shelley Conn replaced Salli Richardson in the role of First Lady of the United States.

Episodes

See also 
 The Children of Men, a 1992 book with a similar premise.
 Children of Men, a 2006 film starring Clive Owen, based on the 1992 book.

References

External links 
 
 

2010s American drama television series
2014 American television series debuts
2014 American television series endings
English-language television shows
Lifetime (TV network) original programming
Post-apocalyptic television series
Pregnancy-themed television shows
Television series by Warner Horizon Television
Television shows filmed in Montreal
Television series set in the 2020s
Television shows set in the United States